Until Tomorrow is an Australian television soap opera created by Reg Watson. The series was produced in colour by the Reg Grundy Organisation for the Seven Network in 1975. It was the second soap opera made by the Reg Grundy Organisation, the first having been Class of '74. It is notable for having been made in Brisbane as opposed to Sydney or Melbourne, and was one of the few Australian soap operas produced for a daytime slot.

Series synopsis
Until Tomorrow examined the activities of various residents of the suburban Vale Street. Storylines involved revenge plots, murder, affairs, and blindness. The cast included Ron Cadee as Bill Wainwright, the corner shop keeper; television personality Hazel Phillips as Marge Stewart, a "widowed gossip on the look out for a mate"; Kaye Stevenson, Muriel Watson, Sue Robinson, Babette Stephens, and Barry Otto.

Critical response
The Sun-Herald, TV writer Allen Glover, said that Until Tomorrow had "the edge over the American serials" in that "the characters are Australian – and believable". However TV critic for The Age, John Pinkney, was withering about the show:

Broadcast
The series debuted in February 1975 and screened at 2.30 pm, opposite US serial General Hospital. It experienced low ratings and by July was moved to 11.30 am. It was cancelled after a run of 180 episodes with none of the current storylines concluded in the final episode.

Until Tomorrow was Reg Watson's first Australian soap opera. He went on to devise the more successful soap operas The Young Doctors (1976),  The Restless Years (1977), Prisoner (1979), Sons and Daughters (1981), and  Neighbours (1985).

Notes

External links 
 

Australian television soap operas
1975 Australian television series debuts
1975 Australian television series endings
English-language television shows
Television series produced by The Reg Grundy Organisation